Pablo Oliveira Serrano (born 8 March 1987) is a Spanish professional footballer who plays for Aroche CF as a right back.

Club career
Oliveira was born in Puebla de Guzmán, Province of Huelva. A product of local Recreativo de Huelva's youth academy, he made his first-team debut on 10 June 2007 in 2006–07's penultimate round in La Liga, appearing as a late substitute in a 5–2 away win against Deportivo de La Coruña. He would spend, however, his first three senior seasons almost entirely with the reserves, amassing only seven top-flight appearances.

For 2009–10, Oliveira was loaned to SD Ponferradina of the third division. He completed the campaign at CD San Roque de Lepe in the same level, and would join the same club midway through 2011–12 after cutting all ties with Recreativo.

References

External links

1987 births
Living people
Sportspeople from the Province of Huelva
Spanish footballers
Footballers from Andalusia
Association football defenders
La Liga players
Segunda División B players
Tercera División players
Divisiones Regionales de Fútbol players
Atlético Onubense players
Recreativo de Huelva players
SD Ponferradina players
CD San Roque de Lepe footballers